Il proscritto (1841), revised as Die Heimkehr des Verbannten (1844) is an opera by Otto Nicolai.

The libretto for Il proscritto by Gaetano Rossi had been given to Nicolai after being rejected by Verdi, this after Nicolai had rejected and given to Verdi Temistocle Solera's libretto for Nabucco. Whereas, Verdi's opera was a triumph, Nicolai's, premiered 13 March 1841 at La Scala was a failure. On his return to Vienna Nicolai had Siegfried Kapper rework Rossi's libretto to produce Die Heimkehr des Verbannten, which premiered successfully 3 February 1844 at Vienna's Theater am Kärntnertor.

Recordings

References

1844 operas
German-language operas
Operas
Operas by Otto Nicolai